Robert Morris Washburn (1868–1946) was an American politician and writer who served in the Massachusetts General Court and wrote a newspaper column and a number of biographies on Massachusetts politicians, including Calvin Coolidge.

Early life
Washburn was born on January 4, 1868, in Worcester, Massachusetts, to Charles F. and Mary E. (Whiton) Washburn. He was the one of seven children. His older brother, Charles G. Washburn, was a member of the United States House of Representatives. Another brother, Reginald, was chairman of the Worcester Liquor Commission. He graduated from Harvard College in 1890 and attended Harvard Law School. He studied law in Worcester offices and was admitted to the bar in 1892. Washburn owned the Princeton Bantam Yards, a poultry farm in Princeton, Massachusetts, where he bred prize-winning Red Pyle Game Bantam hens.

Political career

State legislature
In 1907, Washburn was elected to the Massachusetts House of Representatives. He was described as an "insurgent" and had no problem opposing the state Republican machine. He served as chairman of the committee on railroad and was a vocal opponent of the proposed merger of the Boston & Maine and New York, New Haven, & Hartford railroads. In 1912 he was a candidate for Speaker of the House, but lost to Grafton D. Cushing. In 1915, Washburn was elected to the state senate. He resigned early into his only term in the Senate due to ill health. Following his departure from the legislature, Washburn went to Baltimore to recover. While there he met Martha Ross Clark and the two married in 1916.

Presidential campaigns
Washburn supported Theodore Roosevelt for the Republican presidential nomination in 1912 and 1916. In 1922 Washburn helped establish the Roosevelt Club of Massachusetts and served as its president for many years. Following Roosevelt's death, Washburn supported William Borah.

Statewide campaigns
In 1920, Washburn ran as an independent candidate for Lieutenant Governor of Massachusetts. He finished in third place with 14% of the vote to Republican Alvan T. Fuller's 54% and Democrat Marcus A. Coolidge's 29%.

In 1928, Washburn was a candidate for the United States Senate seat held by David I. Walsh. However he dropped out of the race on July 25 so that he could "take the stump" for fellow candidate Butler Ames. Ames lost the Republican nomination to Benjamin Loring Young. With no other Republicans challenging Walsh in 1934, Washburn entered the race. Walsh defeated Washburn 59% to 37%.

Author
For many years, Washburn penned "Washburn's Weekly", a column in the Boston Transcript. He also wrote a number of biographies on political figures, including William M. Butler. In 1923 he published "Calvin Coolidge: His First Biography", a 150-page character sketch of President Calvin Coolidge.

Death
Washburn died on February 26, 1946, at his home in Boston. He was buried in Worcester's Rural Cemetery.

See also
 1915 Massachusetts legislature
 1916 Massachusetts legislature

References

1868 births
1946 deaths
20th-century American biographers
American columnists
Farmers from Massachusetts
Harvard College alumni
Massachusetts lawyers
Republican Party Massachusetts state senators
Republican Party members of the Massachusetts House of Representatives
Politicians from Boston
Politicians from Worcester, Massachusetts